Charles Val Hall Jr. (March 31, 1948 – May 14, 1998) was a National Football League defensive back. He was drafted by the Green Bay Packers in the third round of the 1971 NFL Draft. He played college football at University of Pittsburgh.

References

1948 births
American football cornerbacks
American football safeties
Pittsburgh Panthers football players
Green Bay Packers players
1998 deaths